Marty James Garton Jr.  is an American singer-songwriter and record producer from Chico, California.

He has released albums and singles as the front man and producer of Scapegoat Wax and One Block Radius. James co-wrote the English-language remix of Luis Fonsi's Despacito, which featured Daddy Yankee and Justin Bieber. The song went on to top charts in both English- and Spanish-speaking parts of the world, won a Latin Grammy, and was nominated for three Grammys.

Performer 
James grew up in Dixon, CA but moved to Chico, CA with his father. By 13, James was performing at local talent shows and making his own demos on equipment he purchased himself. He began submitting the demos to labels and producers in the Bay Area and Los Angeles when he was 16.

During high school, James was discovered by Johnny Zunino of N2Deep. After his two previous groups disbanded, James and Zunino started Scapegoat Wax. The band originally signed to Good Vibe Recordings in 1999 for their first album, Luxurious. In 2000 they moved to the Beastie Boys' Grand Royal Label, and James worked with Mike D on the band's second album, Okeeblow. When Grand Royal collapsed, the band went to Hollywood Records and released SWAX in 2002. The band gained critical acclaim with the media, but failed to establish commercial success.

In 2004, James started One Block Radius with Mr. Dope America, who toured with Scapegoat Wax, and San Francisco emcee Z Man. They signed to Los Angeles independent label Avatar Records in 2005 and released the album Long Story Short, which James wrote, produced, and mixed. James was featured as a guest vocalist on songs by Snoop Dogg, Baby Bash, Paul Wall, The Federation, E-40, and others.

Songwriter 
Since 2010, James has focused on songwriting and producing music for others. He has written songs with and for Jason Derulo, Enrique Iglesias, Pitbull, Snoop Dogg, Christina Aguilera, Timbaland, Afrojack, Nelly, Akon, Wiz Khalifa, Sean Kingston, Ty Dolla $ign, Nicky Jam, Will Smith, and G-Eazy. James is currently songwriting, as well as developing talent, for Pulse Music Group.

"Despacito" 
James, whose mother's family is of Mexican heritage, has written songs for Latin artists. In 2016, Luis Fonsi and Erika Ender brought James on to help with remixing their Spanish-language song "Despacito," featuring Puerto Rican rapper Daddy Yankee. The original song had proven to be a success, and the English language remix that James worked on was intended to expand its appeal. Justin Bieber was brought on to sing on the remix.

The song was released in April 2017 and received international attention, topping charts in 47 countries. It topped the Billboard Hot 100 for a record-tying 16 weeks and topped the Latin 100 for a record-breaking 52 weeks. The song was nominated for three Grammys in 2018: Best Song, Best Record, and Best Pop-Duo. The song won the Best Urban Fusion/Performance award at the 2018 Latin Grammys. The song was also nominated for and won awards at the American Music Awards, Billboard Music Awards, and Billboard Latin Music Awards.

Awards

Grammys 
 
Best Record 2018 – Despacito (Co-Writer) – Nominated

Best Song 2018 – Despacito (Co-Writer) – Nominated

Best Pop-Duo – Despacito (Co-Writer) – Nominated

Latin Grammys 
 
Best Urban Fusion/Performance – Despacito (Co-Writer) – Won

American Music Awards

Collaboration of the Year – Despacito (Co-Writer) – Won

Favorite Pop/Rock Song – Despacito (Co-Writer) – Won

Billboard Music Awards

Top Hot 100 Song – Despacito (Co-Writer) – Won

Top Streaming Song (Audio) – Despacito (Co-Writer) – Nominated

Top Streaming Song (Video) – Despacito (Co-Writer) – Won

Top Selling Song – Despacito (Co-Writer) – Won

Top Collaboration – Despacito (Co-Writer) – Won

Top Latin Song – Despacito (Co-Writer) – Nominated

Billboard Latin Music Awards 

Hot Latin Song of the Year – Despacito (Co-Writer) – Won

Hot Latin Song of the Year (Vocal Event) – Despacito (Co-Writer) – Won

Airplay Song of the Year – Despacito (Co-Writer) – Won

Digital Song of the Year – Despacito (Co-Writer) – Won

Streaming Song of the Year – Despacito (Co-Writer) – Won

Latin Pop Song of the Year – Despacito (Co-Writer) – Nominated

Discography

Select guest appearances

Select writing/production credits

References

External links
 

American singer-songwriters
American male singer-songwriters
Living people
Year of birth missing (living people)